Ashutosh Mukhopadhyay (anglicised spelling of surname: Mukherjee) was a prominent writers of modern Bengali literature.

Life and works
Mukhopadhyay was born on 7 September 1920, in Bajrajogini, Bikrampur, Dacca (now Dhaka) as the fifth of ten children of a Bengali Kulin Brahmin couple, Paresh Chandra Mukhopadhyay and Tarubala Devi. Mukhopadyay graduated in commerce from Hooghly Mohsin College, then affiliated with the University of Calcutta. His first story was Nurse Mitra, published in the newspaper Basumati, which was later made into major movies (Deep Jwele Jai in Bengali and Khamoshi in Hindi). Bollywood films like Safar (1970) and Bemisal were also made from his novels.

His first novel was Swaha, also published in Basumati and later renamed as Ruper Hate Bikikini. His first published novel was Kaalchakra, but he made his mark as novelist with his fourth published novel, Chalachal,<ref
name="sonar"/> especially from its successful cinematisation by Asit Sen in 1956. The cinematisation of Panchatapa in 1957 by the same director, further enhanced the writer's reputation.<ref
name="click"/>

He joined the newspaper Jugantar in 1955 after joining and leaving nine jobs and subsequently became the head of the Sunday special of the newspaper. He died on May 4, 1989.

Ashutosh Mukhopadhyay was one of the most cinematised authors of Bengali literature. Some of the movies made from his stories and novels are listed below. Many of his novels have been translated in other Indian languages. Love and romance and the human relationship are recurring themes of his novels.

Books

Adaptations of works 
 Talaash, 1992 Indian drama series which aired on DD National, based Sonar Kathi Rupor Kathi
 Chalachal
 Safar
 Deep Jwele Jai
 Khamoshi
 Kaal Tumi Aleya
 Aami Se O Sakha (1975)
 Bemisal
 Amar Kantak
 Saat Pake Bandha 
 Kora Kagaz
 Aalor Thikana
 Aaro Ek Jan
 Nabaraag (1971), based on Natun tulir taan
 Sankhabela (1966) from the story 'Sandesh'
 Sabarmati (1969)

References

External links

WorldCat Booklist

1920 births
1989 deaths
Writers from Kolkata
Bengali writers
Bengali novelists
Bengali-language writers
Hooghly Mohsin College alumni
20th-century novelists
Writers from Dhaka